is the 13th single by Japanese band Glay. It reached No. 1 on the weekly Oricon charts and sold 1,611,920 copies in 1998, becoming the best selling Japanese single of the year. It charted for 20 weeks and sold a total of 1,625,520 copies. The title song was used as the TDK "Mini Disc" CM song.

Track list
Yuuwaku (誘惑; Temptation)
Little Lovebirds
Yuuwaku (instrumental)

Covers
In 2012, the song was covered by both Mr. Big singer Eric Martin for his cover album. Fantôme Iris, a fictional visual kei band from multimedia franchise Argonavis from BanG Dream!, covered the song for the mini-album Gin no Yuri/Banzai Rizing!!!/Hikari no Akuma released on December 9, 2020. It was added to the video game as a playable song on February 9, 2021.

References

1998 singles
Glay songs
Oricon Weekly number-one singles